Lake Leon may refer to:

 Lake Leon (Texas)
 Lake Leon (Florida)